Brachyscome is a genus of flowering plants in the family Asteraceae. Most are endemic to Australia, and a few occur in New Zealand and New Guinea.

Name
The genus name is spelled Brachycome by some authors. Henri Cassini published the name Brachyscome in 1816, forming it from the classical Greek brachys ("short") and kome ("hair"), a reference to the very short pappus bristles. Because the combining form of brachys in Greek compound words is brachy-, Cassini later corrected the spelling to Brachycome. Australian taxonomists still debate whether Cassini's corrected spelling is admissible under the rules of botanical nomenclature. A proposal to conserve Brachycome was rejected in 1993 by the Committee for Spermatophyta.

Genetics
One of the annual plains species, Brachyscome dichromosomatica, is remarkable for its low chromosome count. In this species n=2, though some plants have 1, 2 or 3 additional large B chromosomes. The genus has an unusually large range of chromosome counts, from n=2 to n=18.

Description
These are annual and perennial herbs and small shrubs. Species have a basal rosette of leaves and/or leaves alternately arranged on the stem. The blades are entire or divided. The flower heads are solitary or borne in small corymbs. The head has a row of ray florets in shades of white, blue, pink, or mauve, and yellow disc florets.

Fruit
The genus is distinguished from other genera in tribe Astereae mainly by the structure of the fruit. These achenes or cypselas are roughly club-shaped but usually incurved and flattened. They often have a membranous rim or wing around the edge that is sometimes wavy or fringed. The pappus is less than one millimeter long in most species.

Habitat
Brachyscome species are found in a wide range of habitats. They occupy rainy coastal and mountainous regions as well as dry central Australia.

Cultivation
Some Brachyscome species, notably Brachyscome iberidifolia (Swan river daisy), are popular as easily cultivated ornamental plants for flower gardens, and many cultivars are bred for their form, foliage, and flowers.

Species
There are between 65 and 80 species in the genus.

Species include:
Brachyscome aculeata – hill daisy
Brachyscome ascendens
Brachyscome basaltica – swamp daisy
Brachyscome chrysoglossa - yellow-tongue daisy
Brachyscome ciliaris - variable daisy
Brachyscome decipiens – field daisy
Brachyscome dentata
Brachyscome graminea - stiff daisy, grassland daisy
Brachyscome iberidifolia - Swan River daisy
Brachyscome multifida - cut-leaved daisy, rock daisy, Hawkesbury daisy
Brachyscome nivalis – snow daisy
Brachyscome scapigera - tufted daisy
Brachyscome segmentosa - Lord Howe daisy, mountain daisy

References

Further reading
Watanabe, K. and P. S. Short. (1992). Chromosome number determinations in Brachyscome. Muelleria 7, 451–71.

External links

Brachyscome species records. FloraBase. Western Australian Herbarium.

 
Asteraceae genera
Plants described in 1816
Flora of Australia
Taxa named by Henri Cassini